Juan-Francisco Spina (born 8 May 1985) is an Argentine former professional tennis player.

Known as "Pancho", Spina comes from the city of La Plata and had a best singles world ranking of 738. His only ATP Tour main draw appearance came in doubles at the 2009 Indianapolis Championships with Marcos Baghdatis, who he would coach on tour for several years. He won three ITF Futures doubles titles during his career.

ITF Futures titles

Doubles: (3)

References

External links
 
 

1985 births
Living people
Argentine male tennis players
Sportspeople from La Plata
21st-century Argentine people